Bucculatrix albedinella is a moth species of the family Bucculatricidae and was first described in 1839 by Philipp Christoph Zeller. It is found in most of Europe (except Ireland and the Iberian Peninsula).

The larvae can be found elm (Ulmus species), mining the leaves, which consists of a winding full depth corridor with a proportionally long larval chamber. The black frass is deposited in a broad central line, leaving a clear zone at either side. Older larvae live free on the leave, causing window feeding.

References

External links
 
 Bucculatrix albedinella at ukmoths
  Images representing Bucculatrix albedinella at Consortium for the Barcode of Life

Bucculatricidae
Leaf miners
Moths described in 1839
Moths of Europe
Taxa named by Philipp Christoph Zeller